Behice is a village in the Çamlıhemşin District, Rize Province, in the Black Sea Region of Turkey. Its population is 446 (2021).

History 
Most villagers are ethnically Laz.

Geography

References

Villages in Çamlıhemşin District
Laz settlements in Turkey